Ipswich Basketball Club are an English basketball club, based in the town of Ipswich, Suffolk, England.

Honours
Women's National Cup Champions: 2017-18 
Women's National League Division 2 North League Champions: 2017-18
Women's National League Division 2 Playoff Champions: 2017-18

Academy
In partnership with Copleston High School, Ipswich run elite men's and women's under 19 academies, which compete in the Elite Academies Basketball League (EABL) and Women's Elite Academies Basketball League (WEABL) respectively. Both leagues are the top-tier leagues for under 19's basketball in the United Kingdom. Many players have graduated from the academies to further their education and basketball development in the NCAA system in the United States.

Teams
For the 2019-20 season, Ipswich will field the following teams:

Senior Men - National League Division 2 South
Senior Women - National League Division 1 
U18 Men - National League U18 Premier Central
U18 Men II - National League U18 Conference East

U16 Boys - National League U16 Premier Central
U16 Girls - National League U16 Premier North
U14 Boys - National League U14 Premier South East

U14 Girls - National League U14 Premier South
U12 Girls - National League Regional
U12 Mixed - National League Regional

Home Venue
Ipswich are based at Copleston High School in the town.

Season-by-season records

References

Basketball teams in England
Sport in Ipswich